Nagapattinam division is a revenue division of Nagapattinam district in Tamil Nadu, India. It comprises the taluks of Kilvelur, Nagapattinam, Thirukkuvalai and Vedaranyam.

References 
 

Nagapattinam district